Pratibhasthali is a girls school started by Acharya Vidyasagar. Schools are operational in Jabalpur, Dongargarh, Ramtek, Paporaji and Indore in India.

References

External links
 Official website

Girls' schools in India